Zakari Junior Lambo (born 19 January 1999) is a professional footballer who plays as a winger for Knokke. Born in Belgium, he represents the Niger national team.

Career
A youth product of Mouscron and Ronse, Lambo began his career with the semi-pro side Ronse. He transferred to Winkel in 2018, before returning to Ronse the following year. On 5 April 2020, Lambo signed a 2-year contract with Knokke.

International career
Lambo was born in Belgium to a Nigerien father and Burkinabé mother, and holds all three passports. He was called up to represent the Niger national team for a set of friendlies in June 2021. He debuted with Niger in a 2–0 friendly loss to the Gambia on 5 June 2021.

Personal life
Lambo is the son of the former Nigerien international footballer Zakari Lambo.

References

External links
 
 RKFC Profile
 

1999 births
Living people
Sportspeople from Aalst, Belgium
Footballers from East Flanders
People with acquired Nigerien citizenship
Nigerien footballers
Niger international footballers
Belgian footballers
Nigerien people of Burkinabé descent
Belgian people of Nigerien descent
Sportspeople of Burkinabé descent
Black Belgian sportspeople
Belgian people of Burkinabé descent
Association football wingers